Xemxija (pronounced shem-shee-ya) is a suburb on the western part of St. Paul's Bay in the Northern Region, Malta. It is a quiet resort, surrounded by Maltese countryside and some of the most fertile valleys in Malta. There is also a picturesque small fishing harbour. The resort is the gateway to the sandy beaches of Golden Bay and to Mellieħa Bay. There are a number of hotels and restaurants in Xemxija. Lies on the Xemxija Bay.

History
The area around Xemxija has been inhabited since prehistoric times. It contains a number of archaeological sites, which now form a heritage trail. These include a number of rock-hewn tombs, remains of two megalithic temples, a Bronze Age grain silo, trogloditic dwellings, cart ruts, a Roman road, and Roman apiaries.

In around 1715, the Order of St. John built Arrias Battery as part of a series of fortifications defending Malta's coastline. It was also called Xemxija Battery since it was on the sunny side of the bay (xemxija means "sunny" in Maltese), and the area around it became known as Xemxija. Today, the battery is a restaurant.

In 1839, the British built an aqueduct allowing the transportation of water. The water travelled from an underground aqueduct in an area in Wardija, known as tal-Ballut, that extends to an above ground aqueduct and then to a reservoir both in Xemxija. The conservation of water was needed for the British military and their horses, who surveilled the area from the nearby defence posts.

An underground emergency flour mill was built in Xemxija during the Cold War. It has been restored to working condition by the Fondazzjoni Wirt Industrijali Malti (Maltese Industrial Heritage Foundation), and is now open to the public.

Since the 1980s, several apartment blocks were built in Xemxija making it a popular residential area. It is also a small resort, mainly catering with bars and restaurants.

The Simar Nature Reserve forms part of the suburb. A fire and rescue station is located in Xemxija, known as the Xemxija Fire Station.

Further reading

References

Towns in Malta
St. Paul's Bay